Abu Hanifa was the founder of the Hanafi school of Islamic jurisprudence.

Abu Hanifa may also refer to:

Abu Hanifa Dinawari, a 9th-century Kurdish polymath